Orlando Sain (3 February 1912) was an Italian footballer.

Honours
 Coppa Italia winner: 1938-39

1912 births
1995 deaths
Italian footballers
Serie A players
Inter Milan players
Novara F.C. players
Genoa C.F.C. players
L'Aquila Calcio 1927 players
Istrian Italian people
Sportspeople from Pula
Association football goalkeepers
Asti Calcio F.C. players